(born March 4, 1969 in Nagasaki) is a Japanese professional pool player and a WPA World Nine-ball Champion. Nicknamed "the Sniper".

He began practicing pool at 17 and turned professional in 1996. In 1998, he won the WPA World Nine-ball Championship by defeating the reigning champion, Johnny Archer, in the final match. He became the second World Nine-ball Champion from Japan, after Takeshi Okumura, who won it in 1994. In 1999, Takahashi won the ESPN Ultimate Shootout, earning him US$40,000.

Four years later, Takahashi was three stages away from a second world title when he lost to Earl Strickland, who would later win the championship. Takahashi was critical of the Strickland's behavior during the match: "I lost up here. Strickland shows no sportsmanship. He played very well. But no sportsmanship." Strickland denied the allegation of unsportsmanlike conduct.

Achievements
 2013 All Japan 14.1 Championship
 2011 All Japan 14.1 Championship
 2009 Shikoku 9-Ball Open
 2005 All Japan 14.1 Championship
 2005 Hokuriku 9-Ball Open
 2004 Hokuriku 9-Ball Open
 2003 Hokuriku 9-Ball Open
 2002 All Japan 14.1 Championship
 2001 Tohoku 9-Ball Open 
 2000 Hokkaido 9-Ball Open
 2000 Hokuriku 9-Ball Open
 1999 Kansai 9-Ball Open
 1999 ESPN Ultimate Shootout
 1999 Hokuriku 9-Ball Open
 1998 WPA World Nine-ball Championship
 1997 All Japan Championship 9-Ball
 1996 Japan Open 9-Ball

References

External links
 Takahashi's official website
 Kunihiko Takahashi's AZBilliards profile

Japanese pool players
People from Nagasaki
1969 births
Living people
World champions in pool
Asian Games medalists in cue sports
Cue sports players at the 2002 Asian Games
Cue sports players at the 1998 Asian Games
Asian Games silver medalists for Japan
Asian Games bronze medalists for Japan
Medalists at the 1998 Asian Games
Sportspeople from Nagasaki Prefecture
20th-century Japanese people
21st-century Japanese people